Bennett Platform is a high, nearly flat, snow-free mesa of dark rock of Antarctica, about  long and  wide, located immediately east of Mount Black, on the west side of Shackleton Glacier. It was discovered and photographed by U.S. Navy Operation Highjump (1946–47), on the flights of February 16, 1947, and named by the Advisory Committee on Antarctic Names for Floyd Bennett, copilot on the Byrd North Pole Flight of May 1926.

References 

Mesas of Antarctica
Landforms of the Ross Dependency
Dufek Coast